Carlos Alberto Pletz Neder (29 December 1953 – 25 September 2021) was a Brazilian politician and physician.

Biography
A member of the Workers' Party, he served in the Legislative Assembly of São Paulo from 2013 to 2019, 2010 to 2011, and 2005 to 2007. He was also a member of the Municipal Chamber of São Paulo from 2011 to 2012, 2007 to 2008, and 1997 to 2004.

Neder died from COVID-19 in São Paulo on 25 September 2021, during the COVID-19 pandemic in Brazil. He was 67 years old.

References

1953 births
2021 deaths
Brazilian physicians
Brazilian politicians
People from Campo Grande
Workers' Party (Brazil) politicians
Members of the Legislative Assembly of São Paulo
Deaths from the COVID-19 pandemic in São Paulo (state)